Shaikh Zayed University (SZU), also known as Khost University, is a public university in the city of Khost, southeastern Afghanistan. With its original name "Afghan University Peshawar", it was initially established in 2000 in Peshawar. It was shifted to Khost by special orders of the former Afghan President Hamid Karzai. The university was named after Shaikh Zayed bin Sultan Al Nahyan, the first President of the United Arab Emirates, who sponsored the construction of its campus in Khost.

Shaikh Zayed University was officially registered in 2003. The work on the university was officially started during Hakim Taniwal's governorship of Khost Province. The next governor, Merajuddin Patan, made a trip to the UAE (United Arab Emirates), and requested funds for the completion of the university. In order to honor UAE's help, the university was renamed Shaikh Zayed University. Governor Patan had a track record for opening schools, and supporting education for all genders, so it was only natural for him to push for the construction of Shaikh Zayed University. The university's new campus was officially inaugurated in March 2008.

Shaikh Zayed University has 9 faculties and more than 3,000 students. It has a private radio station for journalism faculty. It is the only university in Afghanistan with a faculty in computer science. It has a hostel for students, and medical students are trained at the government-run Khost Hospital.

Shaikh Zayed University is one of 11 Afghan educational institutions that have e-learning facilities, provided by USAID.

Infrastructure 
The library is available to all of the students. On campus the students can use the sports facilities provided by the university.

Faculties

Shaikh Zayed University is a large university and graduates students from the following fields:
 Computer Science
 Medicine
 Engineering
 Literature
 Journalism
 Sharia
 Politics
 Agriculture
 Education
 Economy and Management

References

External links
Official Website of Khost City
Afghan equality alliances
Afghanistan Ministry of Highder Education

Universities in Afghanistan
Educational institutions established in 2000
Khost
2000 establishments in Afghanistan
Public universities in Afghanistan